Sychyov, Sychov or Sychev is a Russian surname derived from the word сыч (sych, meaning "small owl"). It may refer to:

 Alexander Sychyov (1903–1978), Soviet Major, Hero of the Soviet Union (1943)
 Alexander (Daniil) Sychyov (born 1960), monk of the Russian Orthodox Church
 Aleksandr Sychyov (born 1959), retired field hockey player from Russia
 Andrey (Nil) Sychyov (born 1964), Bishop of the Russian Orthodox Church
 Andrey Sychyov (born 1986), former Russian soldier
 Dmitri Sychyov (1972–2010), the Mayor of Melitopol
 Dmitri Sychev (born 1983), Russian football player
 Ivan Sychyov (1911–1945), lieutenant, the recipient of the Order of the Patriotic War, 2nd class
 Nikolai Sychov, Soviet and Russian art historian
 Leonid Sychov, ballet dancer
 Sergei Sychyov (born 1977), Ukrainian ice dancer who also competed for Estonia
 Stanislav Sychov (1937–2003), Ukrainian painter
 Vladimir Sychyov (born 1945), Soviet and French photographer
 Vladimir Sychyov (born 1962), Soviet and Russian footballer and football coach
 Vladimir Sychyov (1924–2016), Soviet and Russian scientist in the field of aerodynamics
 Vladimir Sychyov (born 1971), Soviet and Russian actor
 Vladimir Sychyov (1935–2014), Soviet and Russian swimming coach, honored coach of the USSR
 Vladimir Sychyov (1917–1995), Soviet and Russian sculptor

Russian-language surnames
Masculine surnames